Prochoreutis halimora is a moth in the family Choreutidae. It was described by Edward Meyrick in 1912. It is found in India (Assam) and Taiwan.

References

Natural History Museum Lepidoptera generic names catalog

Prochoreutis
Moths described in 1912